Timothy Bain (born 13 June 1978) is an Australian writer. He is known for writing comedy, children's and animated series for television and as the creator and co-executive producer of ABC Kids' action-comedy series Kangaroo Beach.

Bain has also written for comedy series including Aardman Animations Epic Adventures of Morph, The Rubbish World of Dave Spud, Rove and The Wedge. His children's series credits include PJ Masks, Bluey, Bob the Builder, Fireman Sam, Go Jetters, Counterfeit Cat, Boyster, Tooned 50, Digby Dragon, Dennis the Menace and Gnasher, Bottersnikes and Gumbles, The New Adventures of Figaro Pho, Kuu Kuu Harajuku, Winston Steinburger and Sir Dudley Ding-Dong and Get Ace.

Acting 
Bain has voiced characters in Go Jetters, Love Monster and in Thomas & Friends series 22–24, playing a variety of humans, trains and buses.

Awards 
Bain won Best Children's Episode at the British Writers Guild Awards 2018 and Best Animation at the Australian Writers Guild Awards 2017 for his Counterfeit Cat script "Room of Panic".

Tooned 50, starring the voices of Alexander Armstrong and Brian Cox, and Formula-1 champions Jenson Button, Emerson Fittipaldi, Mika Häkkinen and Alain Prost, won a Gold Eurobest Award in 2013 and a Gold Lovie Award.

Musicals 
Bain has written several high school musical-comedies, You're History!, Lucky, RetroActive and High School Spoof-ical. They are published by Maverick Musicals and have been performed across Australia, New Zealand, United Kingdom, the United States, Japan and South Africa.

Short films 
Bain's short animated films Arctic Adventure (2000) and Kidd Kelly (2003) featured the voices of Eric Bana, Sigrid Thornton, John Clarke, Angus Sampson, Dave Hughes, Kim Gyngell and Judith Lucy. They have screened at festivals including the St Kilda Film Festival, Melbourne International Comedy Festival, Melbourne International Animation Festival and the Massachusetts Children's Film Festival.

References

External links
 
 Official website
 Kangaroo Beach website

1978 births
Australian children's writers
Writers from Melbourne
Living people